The  is a series of light commercial vehicles (vans and pickup trucks) produced and sold by the Japanese automaker Daihatsu since late 2007. It is also rebadged and marketed by Toyota as the Toyota LiteAce and Toyota TownAce since 2008, and by Mazda in Japan as the Mazda Bongo since 2020.

Overview 
Developed by Daihatsu under the lead of chief engineer Masaharu Tezeni, the Gran Max was released in November 2007 as the replacement of the Indonesian market Zebra of similar size. It also replaced the Perodua Rusa in Malaysia. It is similar to the tenth-generation  by its "semi-cab" configuration (front wheels located forward of the door) for both the van and pickup models. Produced in Indonesia by Astra Daihatsu Motor, it is powered by 1,298 cc (K3-DE EFI), 1,495 cc (3SZ-VE VVT-i) and 1,496 cc (2NR-VE Dual VVT-i, since 2020) petrol engines and is both wider and longer than the kei car-sized Hijet.

Markets

Indonesia 
The Gran Max was launched in Indonesia on 6 November 2007 as the successor to the aging Zebra Espass pickup and commercial van. It was initially available with 1.3-litre K3-DE and 1.5-litre 3SZ-VE petrol engines. Both engines were only paired with a 5-speed manual transmission.

In August 2022, the 3SZ-VE engine option was replaced by the newer 2NR-VE unit. No other changes were made to the exterior.

Japan 
Since February 2008, the Gran Max has been exported to Japan where it was firstly sold as the Toyota LiteAce/TownAce, which is positioned below the HiAce. With the facelifted model released in 2020, the LiteAce-badged model was discontinued due to integration of Japanese Toyota dealers. At the same time, Daihatsu started selling the vehicle in Japan as the Gran Max, slotting it above the Hijet kei vehicles. It is the first captive import product in the Japanese Daihatsu lineup. It is also exported to Japan under Mazda brand as the Bongo, which replaced the previous Mazda-built models. These models are offered with optional collision avoidance system marketed as Smart Assist.

Taiwan 
The  pickup was launched for pre-sale in Taiwan in November 2021, and has been assembled locally by Kuozui Motors in Guanyin. Deliveries started in February 2022. The top grade is available with collision avoidance system marketed as Toyota Safety Sense. In October 2022, the company started to take pre-orders for the van model.

Philippines 
It is available in Pickup, Panel Van, FX Utility Van and Cargo  Van models (the latter two were added in August 2022).

GCC 
The  van was released in GCC countries such as Saudi Arabia and the UAE in July 2022 with the 1.5-litre 2NR-VE engine and a 4-speed automatic transmission.

Gallery 
Gran Max

LiteAce/TownAce

Bongo

References

External links 

  (Japan)
  (Indonesia, van)
  (Indonesia, pickup)

Gran Max
Vehicles introduced in 2007
Vans
Pickup trucks
Rear-wheel-drive vehicles
All-wheel-drive vehicles